Demetrius Constantine Dounis (also Demetrios), also known as D. C. Dounis (c.1886 to 1894 – August 13, 1954), was an influential teacher of violin and string instrument technique, as well as violinist, violist, and mandolin player.

Life and work
Considerable uncertainty prevails on the subject of Dounis's early life, beginning with the date of his birth in Athens, variously given as 1886 (according to most library catalogues), 1893, or 1894. He is said to have performed his first violin recital at the age of 7, and to have toured the United States as a mandolinist at 14. In Athens, he participated in the famous Athenian Mandolinata, conducted by Nikolaos Lavdas.  He studied under František Ondříček in Vienna, where he also took a medical degree, specializing in neurology and psychiatry. He also studied in Paris with César Thomson. After World War I, when he served as a doctor in the Greek army, he was appointed to the chair in violin at the State Conservatory of Thessaloniki, but soon established himself in the United States.

Dounis focused his early medical career on treating professional musicians from the world's major symphonies. He would work with a musician for at least six months, observing the musician's technique, asking questions, and devising new exercises to indirectly address the problem. Dounis also wrote several instructional books. In his 1921 volume The Artist's Technique of Violin Playing, Dounis emphasized the importance of shifting and finger exercises. These were to develop the musician's mental map at the beginning of practice, after which scale drills would be more effective.

Selected works
 Dounis Violin Pedagogics
 The Artist's Technique of Violin Playing: A New Scientific Method for Obtaining, in the Shortest Possible Time, an Absolute Mastery of the Higher Technical Difficulties of the Left Hand and of the Bow, Op. 12 (1921)

     First Part: The Left Hand
     Second Part: The Bow
 The Absolute Independence of the Fingers in Violin Playing on a Scientific Basis (in 2 Books), Op. 15 (1924)
     The Absolute Independence of Three Fingers
     The Absolute Independence of Four Fingers
 Preparatory Studies in Thirds and Fingered Octaves on a Scientific Basis for Violin, Op. 16 (1924)
     Thirds
     Fingered Octaves
 Fundamental Trill Studies on a Scientific Basis for Violin, Op. 18 (1925)
 The Dounis Violin Players' Daily Dozen to Keep the Violinist Technically Fit for the Day's Work: Twelve Fundamental Exercises for the Left Hand and the Bow, Op. 20 (1925)
 The Staccato (The Accented Legato, the Accented Staccato): Studies on a Scientific Basis for the Highest Development in Staccato-Playing on the Violin, Op. 21 (1925)
 Preparatory Studies in Octaves and Tenths on a Scientific Basis, Op. 22 (1928)
     Octaves
     Tenths
 Fundamental Technical Studies on a Scientific Basis for the Young Violinist, Op. 23 (1935)
 Specific Technical Exercises for Viola (Left Hand – Bow Arm), Op. 25 (1941)
 New Aids to the Technical Development of the Violinist, Op. 27 (1935)
     The Independence of the Bow from the Left Hand
     A Neglected Phase in the Study of Thirds
 Studies in Chromatic Double-Stops for the Violin, Op. 29 (1942)
 The Higher Development of Thirds and Fingered Octaves: Twenty-four Advanced Formulas for the Violin, Op. 30 (1944)
 Advanced Studies for the Development of the Independence of the Fingers in Violin Playing on a Scientific Basis, Op. 33 (1945)
 The Development of Flexibility in Violin Playing: Studies on Scientific Principles for the Fingers and the Bow, Op. 35 (1945)
 Chopin Étude, Op. 25 No. 6 for Violin (in 2 Books) (1945); technical studies after Frédéric Chopin's Étude, Op. 25 No. 6
     In Thirds
     In Tenths
 The Development of Flexibility, Studies on Scientific Principles for Violin, Book II: Change of Position Studies, Op. 36 (1947)
 Essential Scale Studies, on Scientific Basis, for the Development of the Rhythmic Impulse of the Fingers for Violin, Op. 37 (1947)

References and further reading

References

External links

 The Violin Teachings of D. C. Dounis

19th-century births
1954 deaths
Violin pedagogues
Greek military doctors
Greek classical violinists
Greek classical violists
Musicians from Athens
20th-century Greek physicians
20th-century Greek people
20th-century classical violinists
20th-century violists